Song Without a Name is a 2019 Peruvian drama film directed by Melina León. It was screened in the Directors' Fortnight section at the 2019 Cannes Film Festival. It was selected as the Peruvian entry for the Best International Feature Film at the 93rd Academy Awards, but it was not nominated.

Plot
A mother takes her newborn baby to a health clinic, but the baby and clinic both disappear.

Cast
Lidia Quipse
Lucio Rojas
Maykol Hernández
Pamela Mendoza
Tommy Párraga

See also
 List of submissions to the 93rd Academy Awards for Best International Feature Film
 List of Peruvian submissions for the Academy Award for Best International Feature Film

References

External links
 

2019 films
2019 drama films
Peruvian drama films
2010s Peruvian films
Films based on actual events
Films set in the 1980s
2010s Spanish-language films